Henrieke Goorhuis (born 1990) is a Dutch cartoonist and illustrator. She is known for illustrating Het lastpak, a story featuring the characters Oliver B. Bumble and Tom Puss.

References

1990 births
Dutch children's book illustrators
Dutch illustrators
Dutch comics artists
Dutch female comics artists
Dutch women illustrators
People from Veldhoven
Living people